Lev Aleksandrovich Ilyin (1880 in Tambov Governorate, Russian Empire – 1942) was an architect from the Soviet Union.

Between 1925 and 1938 Lev Ilyin was the main architect of Leningrad (now Saint Petersburg), and an author of the overall map of Leningrad and material in the sphere of town-planning.

1880 births
1942 deaths
People from Rasskazovsky District
People from Tambovsky Uyezd
Soviet architects